The following is an incomplete list of cemeteries in Russia.

Republics

Dagestan
 Kyrkhlyar, Derbent

Tatarstan
 Arskoe Cemetery, Kazan

Krais

Perm Krai
 Yegoshikha Cemetery, Perm

Primorsky Krai
 Czechoslovak Legions Graveyard, Vladivostok

Oblasts

Arkhangelsk Oblast
 Archangel Allied Cemetery, Arkhangelsk

Kaluga Oblast
 Pyatnitskoye Cemetery, Kaluga

Leningrad Oblast
 Sologubovka Cemetery

Moscow Oblast
 Federal Military Memorial Cemetery
 Khovanskoye Cemetery
 Mitinskoe Cemetery

Novosibirsk Oblast
 Monument to the Heroes of the Revolution, Novosibirsk
 Yuzhnoye Cemetery, Novosibirsk
 Zayeltsovskoye Cemetery, Novosibirsk

Rostov Oblast
 Alexander Cemetery, Rostov-on-Don
 Brethren Cemetery, Rostov-on-Don
 Northern Cemetery, Rostov-on-Don
 Verkhne-Gnilovskoye Cemetery, Rostov-on-Don
 Mariupol Cemetery, Taganrog
 Taganrog Old Cemetery

Sverdlovsk Oblast
 The so-called 'Mafia cemetery' in Yekaterinburg, where murdered gangsters were buried under elaborately decorated gravestones.

Volgograd Oblast
 Rossoschka German War Cemetery

Federal Cities

Moscow
 Old Donskoe Cemetery is an old necropolis next to the Donskoy Monastery.
 New Donskoy Cemetery is the 20th-century necropolis outside the monastery walls.
 Kremlin Wall Necropolis – part of the Kremlin Wall where Soviet governments buried many prominent Communist figures.
 Kuntsevo Cemetery
 Memorial park complex of the heroes of the First World War
 Moscow Armenian Cemetery
 Novodevichy Cemetery at the Novodevichy Convent, – many famous Russians and citizens of the former Soviet Union buried here including Nikita Khrushchev, Boris Yeltsin, the writers Nikolai Gogol and Anton Chekhov, and composers Sergei Prokofiev and Dmitri Shostakovich.
 Pantheon, Moscow – a Soviet project in the 1950s to construct a monumental memorial complex
 Preobrazhenskoye Cemetery
 Pyatnitskoye cemetery
 Rogozhskoye cemetery is the center of Old Believer community in Russia and the world.
 Troyekurovskoye Cemetery – burial site of Anna Politkovskaya, Alexander Yakovlev, and Boris Fyodorov
 Vagankovskoye Cemetery, the burial site of Inga Artamonova, Vladimir Vysotsky, Sergei Grinkov, Sergei Yesenin and others.
 Vvedenskoye Cemetery – cemetery of the former German community in Moscow

Saint Petersburg
 Bogoslovskoe Cemetery
 Kazachye Cemetery, part of the Alexander Nevsky Lavra.
 Lazarevskoe Cemetery, part of the Alexander Nevsky Lavra. The oldest surviving cemetery in the city. Scientist Mikhail Lomonosov and Leonhard Euler are buried here.
 Levashovo Memorial Cemetery
 Nikolskoe Cemetery, part of the Alexander Nevsky Lavra.
 Novodevichy Cemetery is part of the eponymous convent in St. Petersburg.
 Peter and Paul Fortress – all Russian Tsars since Peter the Great are buried in the Saints Peter and Paul Cathedral. Other members of the imperial family are buried in the Grand Ducal Burial Vault.
 Piskarevskoye Memorial Cemetery – burial ground for the victims of the Siege of Leningrad and probably the largest cemetery in the world by the number of people interred.
 Serafimovskoe Cemetery – opened in 1905, the location of numerous memorials
 Smolensky Cemetery was the traditional place of burial for the professors of the Imperial Academy of Arts and Saint Petersburg University
 Smolensky Lutheran Cemetery
 Tikhvin Cemetery, part of the Alexander Nevsky Lavra. Among those interred here is author Fyodor Dostoevsky and composer Pyotr Ilyich Tchaikovsky.
 Volkovo Cemetery one of the largest non orthodox cemeteries in Saint Petersburg

Mass graves from executions
Near Moscow
 Butovo firing range
 Kommunarka shooting ground

Near Smolensk
 Katyn war cemetery

In Saint Petersburg
 Levashovo Memorial Cemetery –
 Rzhevsky artillery range near Toksovo (near Saint Petersburg)

In Tver Oblast
 Mednoye, Tver Oblast –

In Republic of Karelia
 Sandarmokh

Russia
Cemeteries
Cemeteries